Clouston Park is a suburb of Upper Hutt, located 0.5 – 2.5 km east-northeast from the city centre. It was predominantly developed in the 1970s and 1980s. While the suburb is predominantly flat, there are a few larger homes situated on the lower slopes of the Eastern Hutt Valley Hills that offer wide views of the Upper Hutt Valley.

Clouston Park can be accessed from SH2 by exiting at either Totara Park Road or Mangaroa Hill Road. It is bordered by Ebdentown to the west (Henry Street onwards), Totara Park to the north (by crossing SH2 at Totara Park Road) and Maoribank to the northeast (by crossing Mangaroa Hill Road).

Clouston Park has two small shopping centres, situated on Clouston Park Road and Fergusson Drive. There is also a light industrial area located on Montgomery Crescent and Mountbatten Grove.

Parks 
There are three public parks in Clouston Park:

- Doris Nicholson Park; Located off of Fergusson Drive and McHattie Lane.

- Benge Park; Primarily located at the end of Rosina Street (has access points from three other streets), it contains a small playground.

- Maoribank Park; Accessed from Clouston Park Road, this larger park has a sports field used by many schools and local sports teams on weekends, as well as hosting the        Rimutaka Rugby Football Club.

Public Transport 
Clouston Park is serviced by the Emerald Hill - Petone and Te Marua commuter bus routes (#110 and #112), operated by Metlink.

Demographics

Clouston Park had a population of 2,289 at the 2018 New Zealand census, an increase of 213 people (10.3%) since the 2013 census, and an increase of 207 people (9.9%) since the 2006 census. There were 864 households. There were 1,158 males and 1,134 females, giving a sex ratio of 1.02 males per female. The median age was 37.1 years (compared with 37.4 years nationally), with 450 people (19.7%) aged under 15 years, 483 (21.1%) aged 15 to 29, 969 (42.3%) aged 30 to 64, and 390 (17.0%) aged 65 or older.

Ethnicities were 80.6% European/Pākehā, 18.5% Māori, 9.4% Pacific peoples, 6.6% Asian, and 1.7% other ethnicities (totals add to more than 100% since people could identify with multiple ethnicities).

The proportion of people born overseas was 19.3%, compared with 27.1% nationally.

Although some people objected to giving their religion, 48.5% had no religion, 38.5% were Christian, 0.9% were Hindu, 0.7% were Muslim, 0.5% were Buddhist and 3.3% had other religions.

Of those at least 15 years old, 276 (15.0%) people had a bachelor or higher degree, and 375 (20.4%) people had no formal qualifications. The median income was $32,800, compared with $31,800 nationally. The employment status of those at least 15 was that 960 (52.2%) people were employed full-time, 216 (11.7%) were part-time, and 78 (4.2%) were unemployed.

References

Suburbs of Upper Hutt
Populated places on Te Awa Kairangi / Hutt River